Buhid is a Unicode block containing characters for writing the Buhid language of the Philippines.

History
The following Unicode-related documents record the purpose and process of defining specific characters in the Buhid block:

References 

Unicode blocks